was a Japanese manufacturer of video arcade games that was founded and headquartered in Mitaka-shi, Tokyo, Japan. It was founded by former employees of the company Data East and was named after its founder and owner name Tadashi "TAD" Yokoyama. They are best known for their first video arcade game, the 1988 shooting gallery-type Cabal, as well as their second one, the 1989 run 'n' gun-style platformer Toki (known in Japan as JuJu Densetsu). In Japan, Taito, Tecmo and Sammy assisted TAD in distributing their arcade titles, while Fabtek distributed every arcade title of TAD's internationally with permission (who were also known for internationally distributing arcade titles by Seibu Kaihatsu with permission). TAD Corporation also licensed its titles for arcade-to-console conversions to other companies such as Ocean Software, Milton Bradley, Rare, Taito and Sega; however, only Cabal and Toki received home conversions. After the release of their last two arcade titles both in 1992: the beat 'em up Legionnaire, and the run 'n gun Heated Barrel; TAD Corporation quietly abandoned its production on February 5, 1993. After ending its business, members were traded to Mitchell Corporation.

Games by TAD Corporation

 Exzisus (1987, worldwide distribution only. Developed by Taito)
 Cabal (1988)
 JuJu Densetsu (Japan) / Toki (U.S.) (1989)
 Blood Bros. (1990)
 Legionnaire (1992)
 Heated Barrel (1992)

References

Amusement companies of Japan
Video game companies disestablished in 1993
Software companies based in Tokyo
 
Defunct video game companies of Japan
Video game development companies
Mitaka, Tokyo
Video game companies established in 1988
Japanese companies established in 1988
Japanese companies disestablished in 1993